A tubing hanger is a component used in the completion of oil and gas production wells.  It is set in the tree or the wellhead and suspends the production tubing and/or casing.  Sometimes it provides porting to allow the communication of hydraulic, electric and other downhole functions, as well as chemical injection. It also serves to seal-in the annulus and production areas.

External links
[Schlumberger Oilfield Glossary https://www.glossary.oilfield.slb.com/Terms/t/tubing_hanger.aspx]

Petroleum production
Oil wells
Tubing (material)